Jam Session featuring Maynard Ferguson is an album by Canadian jazz trumpeter Maynard Ferguson featuring tracks recorded in early 1954 and released on the EmArcy label. The album was Ferguson's first 12-inch LP and was released on CD compiled with Jam Session featuring Maynard Ferguson as Hollywood Jam Sessions in 2005.

Reception

Allmusic awarded the album 3 stars stating "Although the music contains no real surprises, this album has its exciting moments and will be enjoyed by bebop fans". The same reviewer rated Hollywood Jam Sessions 4½ stars stating "Hollywood Jam Sessions has some of Ferguson's most exciting performances from his Los Angeles years".

Track listing
 "Our Love is Here to Stay" (George Gershwin, Ira Gershwin) - 16:07 
 "Air Conditioned" (Maynard Ferguson) - 17:05

Personnel 
Maynard Ferguson - trumpet, valve trombone
Milt Bernhart - trombone
Herb Geller - alto saxophone
Bob Cooper - tenor saxophone 
Claude Williamson - piano
John Simmons - bass  
Max Roach - drums

References 

1955 albums
Maynard Ferguson albums
EmArcy Records albums